Kurohone may refer to:

 Kurohone, Gunma, village in Japan
 6276 Kurohone, a minor planet